Jean M. Bartunek (born 1944) is an American management scientist whose research interests include change management and the relations between business and academia. She is the Robert A. and Evelyn J. Ferris Chair and Professor of Management and Organization at Boston College's Carroll School of Management, and a past President of the Academy of Management.

Education and career
Bartunek was born October 25, 1944 in Cleveland, Ohio; she is a sister of the Society of the Sacred Heart. She has a bachelor's degree from Maryville University and a doctorate from the University of Illinois at Chicago, earned in 1966 and 1976 respectively.

She was an elementary-school and high school teacher from 1968 to 1971. She joined the Boston College faculty as an assistant professor in 1977, was promoted to full professor in 1990, and was given the Robert A. and Evelyn J. Ferris Chair in 2004. She served as president of the Academy of Management for the 2001–2002 term, and has been a trustee of Maryville University since 2003.

Books
Bartunek's books include:
Creating Alternative Realities at Work: The Quality of Work Life Experiment at FoodCom (with M. K. Moch, Harper Business, 1990)
Hidden Conflict in Organizations: Uncovering Behind-the-scenes Disputes (edited with D. Kolb, Sage, 1992)
Insider/Outsider Team Research (with M. R. Louis, Sage, 1996)
Organizational and Educational Change: The life and role of a change agent group (Lawrence Erlbaum Associates, 2003)
Church Ethics and its Organizational Context: Learnings from the Sex Abuse Scandal in the Catholic Church (edited with M. A. Hinsdale and J. F. Keenan, Rowman & Littlefield, 2006)
Academic–Practitioner Relationships: Developments, Complexities, and Opportunities (edited with J. McKenzie, Routledge, 2018)

Recognition
Bartunek was named a Fellow of the Academy of Management in 1999; the Academy of Management also gave her their Career Distinguished Service award in 2009. The University of Roehampton and University of Bath gave her honorary doctorates in 2012 and 2015 respectively.

References

External links

American women academics
Boston College faculty
University of Illinois Chicago alumni
Maryville University alumni
Living people
1944 births
People from Cleveland
Religious Sisters of the Sacred Heart
21st-century American women